Proteles is a genus of distinctive hyenas which contain the aardwolf (Proteles cristatus) and its close fossil relatives. It is the only genus of the subfamily Protelinae.

While the oldest fossils definitely belonging to Proteles date back to the Pliocene, material from the Miocene dating to around 10 million years ago has been suggested to belong to the genus, which would significantly increase its temporal range.

It has been suggested that the Protelinae subfamily may actually be an offshoot of the "running hyenas" (such as Lycyaena) who adapted to an insectivorous diet due to increased competition from canines and felines.

References

Mammal genera
Mammal genera with one living species
Hyenas
Taxa named by Isidore Geoffroy Saint-Hilaire